Leptochilus is a large, mostly Holarctic genus of small sized potter wasps. The genus reaches its largest diversity in the Palearctic where there are more than 135 species belonging to 5 subgenera. However the division of The division of Leptochilus into subgenera can not be fully supported and the status of some of them is dubious.

Species
The following list sets out some of the species included in Leptichilus:

Subgenus Euleptochilus
 Leptochilus camurus (Giordani Soika, 1938)
 Leptochilus cruentatus (Brullé, 1840)
 Leptochilus duplicatus (Klug, 1835) 
 Leptochilus fortunatus Blüthgen, 1958 
 Leptochilus limbiferus (Moravitz, 1867)
 Leptochilus rubellulus (Kohl, 1907)
 Leptochilus somalicus Giordani Soika, 1987

Leptochilus
 Leptochilus mauritanicus (Lepeletier, 1841)

Subgenus Lionutus
 Leptochilus aterrimus (Kirby, 1900)

Subgenus Neoleptochilus
 Leptochilus medanae (Gribodo, 1886)
 Leptochilus tuareg Gusenleitner, 2006

Subgenus Sarochilus
 Leptochilus alterego Gusenleitner, 1970
 Leptochilus brussiloffi (Dusmet 1917)
 Leptochilus gayuboi Sanza 2003
 Leptochilus ibizanus (Schulthess, 1934)
 Leptochilus leopoldoi Sanza, 2003

Subgenus Zendallia
 Leptochilus acolhuus (Saussure, 1857)
 Leptochilus zendalus (Saussure, 1870)

See also
 List of Leptochilus species

References

Parker, F. D. 1966. A revision of the North American species in the genus Leptochilus (Hymenoptera: Eumenidae). Misc. Publ. Entomol. Soc. Am. 5: 153–229.

Notes

Potter wasps